Malappuram is one of the 14 districts in the southern Indian state of Kerala. Kerala, with appreciative development indicators comparable to developed countries, has been experimenting with decentralization and participatory local democracy, ultimately aimed at the realization of the constitutional goal of establishing genuine "institutions of local self-government" since the enactment of Kerala Panchayat Raj Act & The Kerala Municipality Act in the year 1994. Gram Panchayats are the basic units of rural governance in the decentralized system.

Overview
Malappuram is the most populous and the third-largest district in the state. The rural district is divided into 94 Gram Panchayats which are included in 15 blocks namely Areekode, Kalikavu, Kondotty, Kuttippuram, Malappuram, Mankada, Nilambur, Perinthalmanna, Perumpadappu, Ponnani, Tanur, Tirur, Tirurangadi, Vengara, and Wandoor. These blocks combine to form the Malappuram district Panchayat, which is the apex district body of rural governance. Malappuram District Panchayat is the largest District Panchayat as well as the largest local self-government body in the state. The 94 Gram Panchayats are again divided into 1,778 wards. Census towns (small towns with urban features) also come under the jurisdiction of Gram Panchayats. Though the draft notifications for the formation of new Gram Panchayats namely Anamangad, Ananthavoor, Arakkuparamba, Ariyallur, Chembrassery, Elankur, Karipur, Kootayi, Kurumbalangode, Marutha, Pang, Vaniyambalam, and Velimukku were published in 2015, they are yet to be formed. With their formation, the number of Gram Panchayats in the district will become 106.

List of Gram Panchayats in the district

See also
 List of villages in Malappuram district
 List of Desoms in Malappuram district (1981)

References 

Malappuram district